Aysha Akhtar is an American neurologist, public health specialist and animal ethicist. Akhtar is co-founder, CEO, and President of the Center for Contemporary Sciences. She is a US veteran.

Biography

Akhtar has a master’s degree in public health and is double board-certified in both neurology and preventive medicine. She was a Medical Officer for the Food and Drug Administration's Office of Counterterrorism and Emerging Threats and Commander in the U.S. Public Health Service. She was previously Deputy Director of the Army’s Traumatic Brain Injury Program.

Akhtar is a Fellow of the Oxford Centre for Animal Ethics and is a consultant editor for the Journal of Animal Ethics. She is a long-term advocate of animal rights and attended animal protection events from a young age.

In 2019, Akhtar authored Our Symphony with Animals: On Health, Empathy, and Our Shared Destinies which combines medicine, social sciences and personal stories. Her book explores how empathy with animals deeply affects humans’ health and well-being. Akhtar argues that animals are co-equals, worthy of compassion and respect. She has stated that "I am on a mission to show how treating animals with kindness is not only good for animals, but also good for us."

She was a speaker at The Rethinking Animals Summit and the DC VegFest in 2019.

Personal life 
Aysha Akhtar is married and lives in Maryland. She is a first generation Pakistani American and is a contemporary artist. Akhtar is a vegan.

Selected publications

Animals and Public Health: Why Treating Animals Better is Critical to Human Welfare (Palgrave Macmillan, 2012)
The Need to Include Animal Protection in Public Health Policies (Journal of Public Health Policy, 2013)
The Flaws and Human Harms of Animal Experimentation (Cambridge Quarterly of Healthcare Ethics, 2015)
Our Symphony with Animals: On Health, Empathy, and Our Shared Destinies (Pegasus Books, 2019)

References

External links

Ayshaakhtar.com

21st-century American non-fiction writers
American animal rights scholars
Animal ethicists
Anti-vivisectionists
American neurologists
American public health doctors
Women public health doctors
American veganism activists
Food and Drug Administration people
United States Public Health Service personnel
Year of birth missing (living people)
Living people